Artemisia capillaris, ( yīn chén hāo), is a species of flowering plant in the wormwood genus Artemisia, family Asteraceae.

Artemisia capillaris is biennial or perennial herb, 30-80(100) cm tall with vertical, woody rootstock and usually a single to few, slender, erect, pale purplish or reddish brown, glabrous stems. Leaves are silky hairy, basal ones shortly petiolate, middle stem leaves almost sessile. Synflorescence is a narrow to wide panicle with many capitula composed of 8 to 12 yellow florets. Oblong-ovate, brown achenes are minuscule ca. 0.8 mm.

It is native to Pakistan, the western Himalayas, Assam, all of China, Mongolia, the Korean Peninsula, Irkutsk Oblast and Primorsky Krai in Russia, the Ryukyus, and Japan, and has been widely introduced to Afghanistan, India, Nepal, Southeast Asia, all of Malesia, and Taiwan. It is used in traditional Chinese medicine.

References

capillaris
Flora of Pakistan
Flora of West Himalaya
Flora of Assam (region)
Flora of China
Flora of Mongolia
Flora of Irkutsk Oblast
Flora of Primorsky Krai
Flora of Korea
Flora of Japan
Flora of the Ryukyu Islands
Plants described in 1780
Medicinal plants